Kachhpura railway station is a small railway station in Jabalpur district, Madhya Pradesh. Its code is KEQ. It serves Jabalpur city. The station consists of two platforms, neither well sheltered. It lacks many facilities including water and sanitation.

References

Railway stations in Jabalpur district
Transport in Jabalpur
Jabalpur railway division
Buildings and structures in Jabalpur